Lindsay v. Commissioners, 2 S.C.L. 38 (1796), was an early American case in South Carolina that found that a government taking to build a public road did not require compensation to the deprived property owners.  The case as since been overturned by the interpretation of the "just compensation" requirement of the Fifth Amendment.

References

Takings Clause case law
1796 in United States case law
South Carolina state case law
1796 in South Carolina
Law articles needing an infobox